Miyares is a surname. Notable people with the surname include:

Eloína Miyares Bermúdez (1928–2015), Cuban linguist and academic
Fernando Miyares y Gonzáles, Cuban captain general
Jason Miyares (born 1976), American politician and Attorney General of Virginia
Javier Miyares, Cuban-American academic administrator
Marcelino Miyares Sotolongo, Cuban-American marketing executive and politician